The fifth season of the American television drama series Homeland premiered on October 4, 2015, and concluded on December 20, 2015, on Showtime, consisting of 12 episodes. The series started as a loosely based variation of the two-season run of the Israeli television series Hatufim (English: Prisoners of War) created by Gideon Raff and is developed for American television by Howard Gordon and Alex Gansa. The fifth season was released on Blu-ray and DVD on January 10, 2017.

Set two years after the previous season, Season 5 finds Carrie no longer working for the CIA but for a philanthropic foundation in Berlin, the Düring Foundation, but co-operating with her former colleagues to stop a terror attack on Berlin as well as locate a CIA mole. The season includes several real world subjects in its storylines, including ISIS, Vladimir Putin, Bashar al-Assad, the Charlie Hebdo shooting, Edward Snowden and the European migrant crisis.

Cast and characters

Main

 Claire Danes as Carrie Mathison, an ex-CIA intelligence officer with bipolar disorder, now working for a philanthropic foundation in Berlin
 Rupert Friend as Peter Quinn, a CIA SAD/SOG (black ops) operative
 Sebastian Koch as Otto Düring, a German philanthropist and Carrie's boss
 Miranda Otto as Allison Carr, the current Berlin CIA Chief of Station, working directly under Saul
 Alexander Fehling as Jonas Hollander, legal counsel for the Düring Foundation and Carrie's boyfriend
 Sarah Sokolovic as Laura Sutton, an American journalist in Berlin who works for the Düring Foundation
 F. Murray Abraham as Dar Adal, a retired black ops specialist, currently head of the CIA
 Mandy Patinkin as Saul Berenson, the head of the CIA's European operations and Carrie's mentor

Recurring
 Nina Hoss as Astrid, Quinn's former lover who works for the German intelligence service, BND
  as Numan (alias "gabehcuod"), a computer hacker who downloads classified CIA files
  as Armand Korzenik, a friend of Numan's
 Micah Hauptman as Mills, a CIA tech working in the Berlin Station
 Allan Corduner as Etai Luskin, Israeli ambassador to Germany
 Mark Ivanir as Ivan Krupin, a Russian intelligence agent
 Alireza Bayram as Qasim, member of a jihadist group in Berlin
 René Ifrah as Bibi Hamed, leader of a group of jihadists in Berlin
 Morocco Omari as Conrad Fuller, a CIA agent working at the Berlin Station

Guest

 John Getz as Joe Crocker, a CIA officer working in Langley
 Luna and Lotta Pfitzer as Frances "Franny" Mathison, Carrie's daughter
 Alex Lanipekun as Hank Wonham, a CIA officer
 Max Beesley as Mike Brown
 Mousa Kraish as Behruz, an associate of Al Amin
 Suraj Sharma as Aayan Ibrahim, who appears to Carrie in a hallucination
 William R. Moses as Scott
  as Boris, Russian ambassador to Germany
 Yigal Naor as General Youssef
 Janina Blohm Sievers as Sabine, a computer hacker
 Reymond Amsalem as Mrs. Luskin
 Darina Al Joundi as Mrs. Youssef
 Emily Cox as Claudia, friend of Sabine
  as Hajik Zayd, leader of a jihadist group
  as Esam, Carrie's former informant
 Makram Khoury as Samir Khalil, an Iraqi national who helps Carrie
 Darwin Shaw as Ahmed Nazari, a corrupt Iraqi lawyer
 Oshri Cohen as Igal
 Assaad Bouab as Waleed
 Rainer Bock as BND Officer Keller
 Hadar Ratzon Rotem as Tova Rivlin
 Rachid Sabitri as Dr. Aman Aziz, a professor who helps Bibi
 Rus Blackwell as Dr. Emory, a surgical doctor
  as Erna Richter, working for the German Foreign Office

Episodes

Production
The series was renewed for a 12-episode fifth season on November 10, 2014. In April 2015, it was confirmed the entire season would be filmed in Potsdam, Germany, at Studio Babelsberg (with the exception of on-location shooting), making it the first American TV series to film an entire season there. In June 2015, four new series regular roles were announced, including Sebastian Koch, Miranda Otto, Alexander Fehling and Sarah Sokolovic. Production began in Berlin on June 2, 2015. Executive producers for the fifth season are Alex Gansa, Howard Gordon, Gideon Raff, Alexander Cary, Chip Johannessen, Meredith Stiehm, Patrick Harbinson, Lesli Linka Glatter, Avi Nir, and Ran Telem.

Reception

Critical reception
The fifth season received positive reviews from critics. On Metacritic, it has a score of 76 out of 100 based on 17 reviews, indicating "generally favorable reviews". On Rotten Tomatoes, the season received an 88% rating based on 27 reviews with an average rating of 7.99/10. The critical consensus reads "Homeland re-energizes itself in season five by setting up a twisty Berlin-set spy thriller that spotlights Carrie's questionable ethics more than ever." Verne Gay of Newsday gave it an "A" grade and wrote that it's "Smart, taut, engaging and propulsive. The fifth looks terrific." Ben Travers of Indiewire gave it an "A−" grade and wrote that "If last season was the redux, then Season 5 is peak Homeland."

Accolades
For the 22nd Screen Actors Guild Awards, the cast was nominated for Best Drama Ensemble, Claire Danes was nominated for Best Drama Actress, and the series was nominated for Best Stunt Team. For the 42nd People's Choice Awards, Homeland won for Favorite Premium Cable Show.  The American Film Institute named it on their list of the best television programs of 2015. For the 68th Directors Guild of America Awards, Lesli Linka Glatter was nominated for Outstanding Directing – Drama Series for "The Tradition of Hospitality". For the 20th Satellite Awards, Claire Danes won for Best Actress in a Drama Series. For the 68th Primetime Emmy Awards, the series received four nominations: Outstanding Drama Series, Claire Danes for Outstanding Lead Actress in a Drama Series, Lesli Linka Glatter for Outstanding Directing for a Drama Series for "The Tradition of Hospitality", and David Klein for Outstanding Cinematography for a Single-Camera Series for "The Tradition of Hospitality".

References

External links
 
 

2015 American television seasons
5